SBIG can refer to:
 The Santa Barbara Instrument Group, a manufacturer of telescope equipment including Charge-coupled_device cameras, acquired by Diffraction Limited.